Anuraagakkodathi is a 1982 Indian Malayalam film, directed by Hariharan and produced by Areefa Hassan. The film stars Shankar, Rajkumar, Ambika and Madhavi in the lead roles. The film has musical score by A. T. Ummer.

Cast
 
Shankar as Shivadasan
Rajkumar as Ravi
Ambika as Susheela
Madhavi  as Anuradha
Sukumari as Meenakshi
Prathapachandran  as Minister Chandrasekharan
Bahadoor as Muthangakuzhi Gopalan
C. I. Paul as Shivaraman
 Jagathy N. K. Achary as  Professor
Kuthiravattam Pappu as Gopi
Lalithasree 
Oduvil Unnikrishnan as Pachu Nair
Paravoor Bharathan as Kunjunni
Ranipadmini as Mini
Raveendran as Rajan
Sathyachitra as Gomathi
Mafia Sasi

Soundtrack
The music was composed by A. T. Ummer and the lyrics were written by Mankombu Gopalakrishnan and Sathyan Anthikkad.

References

External links

view the film
 Anuraga Kodathi Malayalam film

1982 films
1980s Malayalam-language films